Heroyiv Sevastopolya is a station on the Kyiv Light Rail. It was opened in 1977.

External links
 

Kyiv Light Rail stations